Im Sonderauftrag (English-language title: Special Mission) is an East German black-and-white film directed by Heinz Thiel. It was released in 1959.

Plot
In 1958, somewhere in the Baltic Sea, a People's Navy minesweeper commanded by Captain Fischer encounters a foreign boat. Its skipper is a man named Arendt, who has served with Fischer in the Kriegsmarine during the Second World War. Fischer recalls how, in 1943, his superior Captain Lieutenant Wegner planned to defect to the Danish resistance and join the communists, but was arrested and sentenced to death. Fischer realizes that Arendt, one of the few who knew of Wegner's plans, was actually a Gestapo agent and betrayed him. Now, he understands that Arendt works for West Germany and intends to gather intelligence in the German Democratic Republic. Fischer foils his plans and the minesweeper returns to its mission.

Cast
Hans-Peter Minetti as Captain Lieutenant Fischer
Rolf Ludwig as Arendt
Fritz Diez as Captain Lieutenant Wegner
Gerd Michael Henneberg as harbor commandant
Günther Grabbert as Lieutenant Hermann
Wolfgang Hübner as Lieutenant Berger
Wilhelm Koch-Hooge as Petersen
Herbert Körbs,  as military judge
Horst Kube as corporal Lutz
Werner Lierck as Sergeant Kohl
Katharina Matz as Ike
Dieter Perlwitz as Jens Dahl
Gustav Püttjer as Ole
Albert Zahn as Thielicke
Manfred Borges as Staff Sergeant Schneider

Production
Of the 500 feature films created by DEFA from 1956, the year in which the National People's Army was founded, until its dismantlement during 1990, only five had their plot dealing explicitly with the East German armed forces - although many pictures were set in historical military formations, like the Wehrmacht, and DEFA produced many documentaries and news bulletins about the NVA. Of the five films, the first to be made was Im Sonderauftrag. It was also the only one among them to portray the People's Navy.

Reception
The East German Cinema and Television Review defined Im Sonderauftrag as a "weak, fable-based" film that "used the anti-fascist theme in a schematic manner." The film was received well in the Soviet Union, and gained "considerable success" there. The German Film Lexicon cited Im Sonderauftrag as "thrilling and with good acting, although highly simplistic and committed to the political narrative of the Cold War."

References

External links
 
Im Sonderauftrag on DEFA Sternstunden.

1959 films
East German films
1950s German-language films
German black-and-white films
Films set in the Baltic Sea